Kapp Koburg is a headland at the western part of Kongsøya in Kong Karls Land, Svalbard. It is located at the western side of Hårfagrehaugen, and defines the southwestern extension of the bay Bünsowbukta.

References

Headlands of Svalbard
Kongsøya